The Museum of the Cetinska Krajina Region in Sinj is a museum focusing on the cultural and historical heritage of the Cetinska Krajina region. It was founded in 1956 and has several collections including archaeological, numismatic, cultural historical, ethnographic and natural science collections.

References

External links
Museum of the Cetinska Krajina Region

Museums established in 1956
Tourist attractions in Split-Dalmatia County
Cetinska